The 1905 Campeonato Paulista, organized by the LPF (Liga Paulista de Football), was the 4th season of São Paulo's top association football league. Paulistano won the title for the 1st time. no teams were relegated and the top scorer was Germânia's Hermann Friese with 14 goals.

System
The championship was disputed in a double-round robin system, with the team with the most points winning the title. The last-placed team would dispute a playoff to remain in the league.

Championship

Relegation Playoffs

Preliminary round

|}

Playoffs

|}

References

Campeonato Paulista seasons
Paulista